João Manuel Jesus Varudo Afonso (born 6 June 1992) simply João Varudo, is a Portuguese footballer who plays for Clube Oriental de Lisboa, as a defender.

Football career
On 23 September 2015, Varudo made his professional debut with Oriental in a 2015–16 Taça da Liga match against Estoril Praia.

References

External links

Stats and profile at LPFP 

 (SportsTG)

1992 births
Living people
Portuguese footballers
Association football defenders
Liga Portugal 2 players
Clube Oriental de Lisboa players